Nyassa may refer to:

Nyassa Company, a royal company which administered part of Mozambique between 1891 and 1929
Niassa Province, a province of Mozambique
Malawi, a country in Southern Africa once known as Nyasaland
Lake Malawi, a lake between Malawi and Mozambique also known as Lake Nyassa

See also
Nyssa (disambiguation)
Nyssa (plant), a small genus of deciduous trees